The Beautiful Cheat is a 1945 American comedy film directed by Charles Barton and written by Ben Markson and Elwood Ullman. The film stars Bonita Granville, Noah Beery Jr., Margaret Irving, Sarah Selby, Irene Ryan, Carol Hughes and Tom Dillon. The film was released on July 20, 1945, by Universal Pictures.

Plot

A sociologist sends his friend, a psychologist, to a local detention center to obtain a delinquent teenager for the sociologist to study for a book he is writing. When the psychologist is unable to get a teenager released to his custody, he convinces a secretary to pose as one. The fake delinquent causes chaos in the sociologist's life and home.

Cast         
Bonita Granville as Alice
Noah Beery Jr. as Prof. Alexander Haven
Margaret Irving as Olympia Haven
Sarah Selby as Athene Haven
Irene Ryan as Miss Beatrice Kent
Carol Hughes as Dolly Marsh
Milburn Stone as Lucius Haven
Tom Dillon as Cassidy
Edward Gargan as Manager
Lester Matthews as Farley
Edward Fielding as Dr. Horace Pennypacker
Tommy Bond as Jimmy

References

External links
 

1945 films
1945 comedy films
American black-and-white films
American comedy films
1940s English-language films
Films directed by Charles Barton
Universal Pictures films
1940s American films